Machat, Machát is a surname. Notable people with the surname include:

Bohumír Machát (born 1947), Czechoslovak slalom canoeist
Jeff Machat (born 1961), American ophthalmologist
Mike Machat, American artist, author, and aviator
Steven Machat (born 1952), American lawyer and entertainment executive